The first social maps date from the early 20th century. A recent example is the mapping of the residences of U.S. Facebook users and their social links.

In marketing, a social map is a visualized analysis of a digital identity of a person, brand or company. A social map shows exactly where a digital identity is created, formed or discussed and sets each element in context and proportions.

These social maps created an intense discussion about digital reputation and digital identities. For companies, a so-called corporate social map is still a very new and unusual methodology, but also very effective and meaningful.

See also
 Sociogram

Human geography